Green Lantern: Emerald Dawn is a 1989-1990 limited series comic book published by DC Comics. The series retold the origins of Hal Jordan and how he became a Green Lantern in post-Crisis continuity. It is created by Keith Giffen and Gerard Jones, with the first issue written by Jim Owsley.

Emerald Dawn II
Green Lantern: Emerald Dawn II is the sequel to Green Lantern: Emerald Dawn. It was published from April to September 1991. This series explores what happened during Jordan's 90-day jail sentence, when he was taken under training by Sinestro.

Green Lantern: Secret Origin
Certain aspects and events of Emerald Dawn have been retconned by the 2008 arc Secret Origin, written by Geoff Johns.

Collected editions
Green Lantern: Emerald Dawn was first reprinted with newsprint-type paper and cheaper priced trade paperbacks in 1991 with new cover art by M. D. Bright and Klaus Janson. It was later collected as trade paperback once again in 2003 with a brand-new cover by Alan Davis and Mark Farmer.

Green Lantern: Emerald Dawn II was collected for the first time as a trade paperback in 2003 with new cover art by Alan Davis and Mark Farmer. This book is currently out of print.

Green Lantern: Hal Jordan Vol. 1 trade paperback collects both Green Lantern: Emerald Dawn #1-6 and Green Lantern: Emerald Dawn II #1-6 in a single volume for the first time in chronological order.

References